Klimavichy District (Klimovichsky raion) is a district in Mogilev Region, Belarus. The administrative center is the town of Klimavichy. As of 2009, its population was 28,523. Population of Klimavichy accounts for 59.8% of the district's population.

References

 
Districts of Mogilev Region